was a Japanese pop duo consisting of  and . They were signed to Columbia Music Entertainment.  The duo's name is based on a pun on the term melodic hardcore.

History
Melocure formed in April 2002 and debuted with the song Itoshii Kakera (My Better Half), which was used as the anime series UFO Ultramaiden Valkyries opening theme song. More of Melocure's work was used as insert songs and themes for subsequent seasons of the show, as well as in the soundtracks of Stratos 4 and Okusama ha Mahō Shōjo. Melocure also had a weekly internet radio talk show. They released their album Melodic Hard Cure in March 2004. Less than two months later, Okazaki died suddenly at the age of 44 from septic shock as a result of sepsis. Melocure's final song, Home & Away, was finished by Hinata after Okazaki's death and released more than a year later.

Although Okazaki has died, Hinata has said on her radio show that she will continue Melocure for the rest of her life, singing Melocure songs at her live shows in Okazaki's memory.

Discography
Melocure released a total of four singles and one album.

Singles
2002.07.20  Itoshii Kakera (愛しいかけら) - first season opening theme to UFO Ultramaiden Valkyrie
2003.02.01  1st Priority - opening theme to Stratos 4
2003.10.22  Meguriai (めぐり逢い) - second opening theme to UFO Ultramaiden Valkyrie
2005.07.27  Home & Away (ホーム＆アウェイ) (c/w Kikuko Inoue's Jewelry) - opening theme to Okusama ha Mahō Shōjo

Albums
2004.03.17  Melodic Hard Cure (メロディック・ハード・キュア)'
Pop Step Jump!
1st Priority

Agapé
birthday girl

Sunday Sundae

ALL IN ALL
rainbow kind of feeling
So far,so near

 - bonus track

Sources

External links
 MELOCURE's homepage 

Japanese pop music groups
Nippon Columbia artists
Anime musical groups